KISS Pinball is a video game developed by Wildfire Studios and published by On Deck Interactive for Microsoft Windows in 2000. A port for PlayStation, developed by Tarantula Studios, was released by Take-Two Interactive in 2001.

Gameplay
Concerning gameplay, "most of the game revolves around hitting targets to start KISS shows, then hitting more targets to complete the shows....Nudging the ball, which is accomplished by hitting the D-pad, simply causes the ball to jerk an inch or two in the direction you pressed." The game "features two tables, Last Stop Oblivion and Netherworld."

Reception

The PlayStation version received "generally unfavorable reviews" according to the review aggregation website Metacritic.

Jeff Gerstmann of GameSpot declared, "KISS Pinball manages to mangle both the KISS license and the concept of video pinball to the point of being almost totally unrecognizable....KISS Pinball serves no useful purpose whatsoever. KISS fans will be disappointed by the distinct lack of KISS, and pinball fans will be disappointed by the distinct lack of pinball. Even at the low price of $9.99, this one is no bargain." Eric Bratcher of NextGen said that the game was "far from the hardest-rocking show in history, but the ticket price is hard to resist." Paul Davidson of San Francisco Chronicle said, "The Kiss Pinball package for home computers and gaming systems wasn't exactly a smash success."

The PlayStation version was a runner-up for GameSpots annual "Worst Game" award among console games, which went to Kabuki Warriors.

See also
Kiss (pinball)

References

External links

2000 video games
Band-centric video games
Cultural depictions of Kiss (band)
Kiss (band) video games
Video games based on musicians
Pinball video games
PlayStation (console) games
Take-Two Interactive games
Video games developed in Australia
Windows games